Holetschek is a German-Slavic language surname. People with that name include:
Johann Holetschek (1846–1923), Austrian astronomer
Holetschek (crater), a lunar crater named after the astronomer
Olaf Holetschek (1968), German former footballer

German-language surnames